Han Dawei (born 6 October 1977) is a Chinese cross-country skier. He competed at the 2002 Winter Olympics and the 2006 Winter Olympics.

References

External links
 

1977 births
Living people
Chinese male cross-country skiers
Olympic cross-country skiers of China
Cross-country skiers at the 2002 Winter Olympics
Cross-country skiers at the 2006 Winter Olympics
Skiers from Heilongjiang
Asian Games medalists in cross-country skiing
Cross-country skiers at the 1999 Asian Winter Games
Cross-country skiers at the 2003 Asian Winter Games
Cross-country skiers at the 2007 Asian Winter Games
Asian Games bronze medalists for China
Medalists at the 2003 Asian Winter Games